The Twist is a Canadian documentary film, directed by Ron Mann and released in 1992. The film is a history of the twist dance craze of the early 1960s, exploring the creative, social and political contexts in which it was created and embraced by the public.

The film premiered at the 1992 Festival of Festivals, as the closing night gala.

The film was a Genie Award nominee for Best Feature Length Documentary at the 14th Genie Awards in 1993.

References

External links 
 

1992 films
1992 documentary films
Canadian documentary films
Documentary films about rock music and musicians
Films directed by Ron Mann
1990s Canadian films